The 1886 Invercargill mayoral election was held on 24 November 1886.

Incumbent mayor John Lyon McDonald was defeated by David Roche.

Results
The following table gives the election results:

References

1886 elections in New Zealand
Mayoral elections in Invercargill